Borjomi Strict Nature Reserve is a protected area in Borjomi Municipality, Samtskhe-Javakheti region of Georgia.

Flora 
The tallest tree of the region — Caucasian fir (Abies nordmanniana) grows in protected area and can be more than 50 m in height. It can be still higher in other locations with more moisture in  western Caucasus and Abkhazia. Sessile oak (Quercus petraea), oriental hornbeam (Carpinus orientalis) and Scots pine (Pinus sylvestris) predominantly grow on dry southern slopes. The uppermost forest zone mainly occupied by Caucasian downy birch (Betula pubescens)  and European rowan (Sorbus aucuparia). The forest floor is fairly clear.

Fauna 
Rare Caucasian Salamander (Mertensiella caucasica) habitat is protected at Borjomi Strict Nature Reserve.

See also
 Borjomi-Kharagauli National Park
 Nedzvi Managed Reserve
 Goderdzi Petrified Forest Natural Monument

References 

National parks of Georgia (country)
Protected areas established in 1929
Geography of Samtskhe–Javakheti
Tourist attractions in Samtskhe–Javakheti